John Derek Carson-Parker (28 February 1927 – 5 November 2016), known as John Carson, was an English actor known for his appearances in film and television.

Early life and education
Born to English parents in Colombo, Ceylon (now Sri Lanka), where his father worked on tea and rubber plantations, he was educated in Australia and went to Britain to do national service as an artillery officer in an anti-aircraft regiment between 1944 and 1945. He then studied law at Queen's College, Oxford before leaving for New Zealand, where he worked in amateur theatre before returning to Britain to begin his professional career. His stage appearances included the original productions of A Man For All Seasons and A Day in the Death of Joe Egg.

Career
Making his film debut in 1947, Carson carved out a career appearing in low-budget British films such as Seven Keys (1961); Smokescreen (1964); and Master Spy (1964). His saturnine looks and sinister voice (sometimes compared with James Mason) led to him starring in a number of horror films including The Night Caller (1965); The Plague of the Zombies (1966); The Man Who Haunted Himself (1970); Taste the Blood of Dracula (1970); and Captain Kronos – Vampire Hunter (1972).

Beside his appearances in horror films he was also known for his many villainous turns in adventure series of the 1960s, such as The Adventures of Robin Hood; The Avengers; The Saint; Adam Adamant Lives!; The Baron; Man in a Suitcase; The Champions and Department S.

His long and varied list of television credits include Emergency - Ward 10; Ivanhoe; William Tell; Armchair Theatre; Maigret; Out of the Unknown; Emma (as Mr. Knightley); Dixon of Dock Green; Crown Court; The New Avengers; Telford's Change; Secret Army; Special Branch; The Professionals; Tales of the Unexpected; Hammer House of Horror; Doctor Who (Snakedance); Shaka Zulu and Poirot. He was also the voice-over performer in Sunsilk TV commercials.

Personal life
Carson moved with his family to South Africa in 1983 and continued to work in film and television. He died at his home in Cape Town on 5 November 2016 at the age of 89. Married twice, he was survived by his second wife, novelist Luanshya Greer, a British actress, who is best known for her roles on television during the 1960s. In 1966, she had changed her forename from Pamela to Luanshya, and become a writer for TV shows including Dixon of Dock Green, Thriller and Triangle. Carson was also survived by his six children, four from his first marriage, Richard, Chris, Katie and Harry, and two from his second marriage, Ben and Suzanna.

Selected filmography

Film

 Conspiracy in Teheran (1946)
 Quentin Durward (1955) - Duke of Orléans
 Ramsbottom Rides Again (1956) - (uncredited)
 Intent to Kill (1958) - Hospital Receptionist
 The Lady Is a Square (1959) - Reporter (uncredited)
 Seven Keys (1961) - Norman
 Guns of Darkness (1962) - First Officer
 Edgar Wallace Mysteries, Locker Sixty-Nine (1962) - Miguel Terila
 The Set Up (1963) - Insp. Jackson
 Master Spy (1963) - Richard Colman
 Accidental Death (1963) - Paul Lanson
 Smokescreen (1964) - Trevor Bayliss
 Edgar Wallace Mysteries, Act of Murder (1964) - Tim Ford
 The Night Caller (1965) - Major
 The Plague of the Zombies (1966) - Squire Clive Hamilton
 Thunderbird 6 (1968) - Captain Foster (II) (voice)
 Taste the Blood of Dracula (1970) - Jonathon Secker
 The Man Who Haunted Himself (1970) - Ashton
 Male Bait (1971)
 Captain Kronos – Vampire Hunter (1974) - Dr. Marcus
 Skating on Thin Uys (1985) - BBC Man
 Survivor (1987) - Engineer Councillor
 Tenth of a Second (1987) - Man from Organization
 City of Blood (1987) - Prime Minister
 An African Dream (1987) - Harry Endicott
 Diamonds High (1988) - Heinrich
 The Last Warrior (1989) - Priest
 Schweitzer (1990) - Horton Herschel
 The Sheltering Desert (1991) - Harding
 The Last Hero (1991) - Fred Zimmerman
 My Daughter's Keeper (1991) - Bernard Eton
 Woman of Desire (1994) - Judge Parker
 Mandela and de Klerk (1997, TV Movie) - Willem de Klerk
 Operation Delta Force 3: Clear Target (1998) - President Farrington
 I Dreamed of Africa (2000) - Pembroke Headmaster

 The Deal (2008) - Nigel Bland
 Doomsday (2008) - George Dutton

TV

 Story Parade - The Caves of Steel (1964) - R. Daneel Olivaw
 Crown Court
 Ivanhoe (1958-1959) - Sir Robert / Sir Roderick / Sir Morten / Guard Captain
 Armchair Theatre (1958-1959) - Aengus MacOgue / Tom Brook / Borghem
 Emergency - Ward 10 (1959) - Donald Latimer
 The Adventures of William Tell (1959) - Fritz
 Oliver Twist (1962) - Monks
 The Avengers (1963-1965) - Fitch / Marten Halvarssen / Ariston
 Hereward the Wake (1965) - William the Conqueror
 Dombey and Son (1969)
 Out of the Unknown (1971) - Allen Meredith
 Emma (1972) - Mr. Knightley
 Dixon of Dock Green (1976) - Joe Conway / Francis Spurling
 The New Avengers (1976) - Freddy
 Secret Army (1977) - Hans Van Reijn
  (1978) - James More
 The Professionals (1978) - Brian Forrest
 Telford's Change (1979) - Jean Dieber
 Tales of the Unexpected (1980) - Arthur
 Hammer House of Horror (1980) - Charles Randolph
 Doctor Who (1983, Serial: Snakedance) - Ambril
 Strangers and Brothers (1984) - Jago
 Shaka Zulu (1986) - Lord Kimberley
 Poirot (1989-2005) - Richard Abernethie / Sir George Carrington
 Maigret (1997) - Docteur

References

External links

1927 births
2016 deaths
People from Colombo
Alumni of The Queen's College, Oxford
English male stage actors
English male film actors
English male television actors
English expatriates in South Africa
20th-century English male actors
21st-century English male actors